The Gulf Club Champions Cup, is a football league tournament for the Arabian Peninsula clubs. The 1987 edition was known as the Gulf Cooperation Council Club Tournament.

The tournament doubled up as the qualifying round of the 1987–88 Asian Club Championship. The winners and runners up would progress to the ACC's latter stages.

Results

All matches were played in Kuwait.

Winner

 
 

GCC Champions League
Gulf